Euhadenoecus is a genus of camel crickets in the family Rhaphidophoridae. There are at least four described species in Euhadenoecus.

Species
 Euhadenoecus adelphus Hubbell & Norton, 1978 (adelphos camel cricket)
 Euhadenoecus fragilis Hubbell & Norton, 1978 (tawneys cave cricket)
 Euhadenoecus insolitus Hubbell & Norton, 1978 (McCluney cave cricket)
 Euhadenoecus puteanus (Scudder, 1877) (puteanus camel cricket)

References

Further reading

 
 

Rhaphidophoridae